Victor Elementary School District (VESD) is a school district headquartered in Victorville, California.

Schools
Brentwood (Victorville)
Challenger (Victorville)
Del Rey (Victorville)
Discovery (Victorville)
Endeavour (Victorville)
Galileo (Victorville)
Green Tree East (Victorville)
Irwin Academy (Victorville)
Liberty (Victorville)
Lomitas (Victorville)
Mojave Vista (Victorville)
Mountain View Montessori (Victorville)
Park View Preparatory (Victorville)
Puesta Del Sol (Victorville)
Sixth Street Prep (Victorville)
Village Elementary (Victorville)
West Palms Conservatory (Victorville)

References

External links
 

Victorville, California
School districts in San Bernardino County, California